The following low-power television stations broadcast on digital or analog channel 42 in the United States:

 K42DZ-D in Battle Mountain, Nevada, to move to channel 34
 K42FE-D in Shreveport, Louisiana, to move to channel 27
 K42IH-D in East Wenatchee, Washington, to move to channel 28
 K42IM-D in Minot, North Dakota, to move to channel 35
 K42IQ-D in Flagstaff, Arizona, to move to channel 21
 K42JQ-D in Redding, California, to move to channel 27
 KMSX-LD in Sacramento, California, to move to channel 33
 W42CK in Hagerstown, Maryland, to move to channel 25

The following stations, which are no longer licensed, formerly broadcast on digital or analog channel 42:
 K42BR in Terrebonne-Bend, etc., Oregon
 K42CF-D in Gruver, Texas
 K42CH-D in Capulin, etc., New Mexico
 K42CL in Eureka, Nevada
 K42CR-D in Tucumcari, New Mexico
 K42EC in Fairbanks, Alaska
 K42EV-D in Glenwood Springs, Colorado
 K42FA in Woodland & Kamas, Utah
 K42FH in Bemidji, Minnesota
 K42GN-D in Preston, Idaho
 K42GV in Susanville, etc., California
 K42HI in Muscatine, Iowa
 K42IR in Astoria, Oregon
 K42JB-D in Wyola, Montana
 K42KR-D in Mountain View, Wyoming
 K42LH-D in Winston, Oregon
 KBVZ-LP in McCook, Nebraska
 KIDZ-LD in Abilene, Texas
 KSCZ-LP in Greenfield, California
 KSEX-CD in San Diego, California
 KVCV-LP in Victoria, Texas
 W42AX-D in Bakersville, North Carolina
 W42DD in Meridian, Mississippi
 W42DF-D in Cashiers, North Carolina
 W42DZ-D in Adjuntas, Puerto Rico
 WJTD-LP in Jackson, Tennessee
 WMOE-LD in Mobile, Alabama

References

42 low-power